Holt House or Holt Farm or variations may refer to:

United Kingdom
Holt House Stadium is the playing ground of Colne F.C.

United States
Elbert W. Holt House, Nashville, Arkansas, listed on the NRHP in Howard County, Arkansas 
Flavius Holt House, Nashville, Arkansas, listed on the NRHP in Howard County, Arkansas 
Benjamin Holt House, Stockton, California, listed on the NRHP in San Joaquin County, California
Ryves Holt House, Lewes, Delaware (1665), oldest residential house in Delaware
Holt–Peeler–Snow House, Macon, Georgia, NRHP-listed
Walter R. Holt House, Macon, Georgia, listed on the NRHP in Bibb County, Georgia 
Lemon Wond Holt House, Honolulu, Hawaii, listed on the NRHP on Oahu, Hawaii
Holt House (Monmouth, Illinois), a museum in Illinois where Pi Beta Phi Fraternity was founded
Joseph Holt House and Chapel, Addison, Kentucky, listed on the NRHP in Breckinridge County, Kentucky 
Giltner-Holt House, Frankfort, Kentucky, listed on the NRHP in Franklin County, Kentucky
Holt Farm (Andover, Massachusetts), NRHP-listed
Holt-Cummings-Davis House, Andover, Massachusetts, NRHP-listed
Dinehart-Holt House, Slayton, Minnesota, listed on the NRHP in Murray County, Minnesota
L. Banks Holt House, Alamance, North Carolina, listed on the NRHP in Alamance County, North Carolina 
Holt-Frost House, Burlington, North Carolina, listed on the NRHP in Alamance County, North Carolina 
Moore-Holt-White House, Burlington, North Carolina, listed on the NRHP in Alamance County, North Carolina
Holt-Harrison House, Fayetteville, North Carolina, listed on the NRHP in Cumberland County, North Carolina 
Charles T. Holt House, Haw River, North Carolina, listed on the NRHP in Alamance County, North Carolina
Dr. William Rainey Holt House, Lexington, North Carolina, listed on the NRHP in Davidson County, North Carolina
Holt–Saylor–Liberto House, Portland, Oregon, NRHP-listed
Thomas Holt House, Brentwood, Tennessee, NRHP-listed
Samuel and Geneva Holt Farmstead, South Jordan, Utah, NRHP-listed
Charles B. Holt House, Charlottesville, Virginia, NRHP-listed
Holt House (Washington, D.C.), a Smithsonian Institution building on the National Zoo grounds
Ferrell-Holt House, Moundsville, West Virginia, NRHP-listed
Holt and Balcom Logging Camp No. 1, Lakewood, Wisconsin, NRHP-listed
Holt-Balcom Lumber Company Office, Oconto, Wisconsin, listed on the NRHP in Oconto County, Wisconsin